The John Glassco Translation Prize is an annual Canadian literary award, presented by the Literary Translators' Association of Canada to a book judged the year's best translation into either English or French of a work originally written in any language. The winning writer is awarded $1,000 and a free membership to LTAC.

Winners
1982 - Susanne de Lotbinière-Harwood, Neons in the Night (Lucien Francœur, selected poetry)
1983 - Michèle Venet and Jean Lévesque, L'Invasion du Canada (Pierre Berton, The Invasion of Canada and Flames Across the Border)
1984 - Barbara Mason, Description of San Marco (Michel Butor, Déscription de San Marco)
1985 - Wayne Grady, Christopher Cartier of Hazelnut, Also Known as Bear (Antonine Maillet, Christophe Cartier de la Noisette dit Nounours)
1986 - Carole Noël, On n'en meurt pas (Olga Boutenko, unpublished manuscript)
1987 - Liedewy Hawke, Hopes and Dreams: The Diary of Henriette Dessaulles 1874-1881 (Henriette Dessaulles, Fadette: Journal d'Henriette Dessaulles 1874-1880)
1988 - Heather Parker, Juliette (Michel Goeldin, Juliette crucifiée)
1989 - Charlotte Melançon, Shakespeare et son théâtre (Northrop Frye, Northrop Frye on Shakespeare)
Honourable Mention - Donald Winkler, Rose and Thorn: Selected poems of Roland Giguère (Roland Giguère, selected poetry)
1990 - Daniel McBain, Cocori (Joaquín Gutiérrez)
1991 - Matt Cohen, The Secret Voice (Gaétan Brulotte, Le Surveillant)
1992 - Bruno Guévin, No 44, le mystérieux étranger (Mark Twain, The Mysterious Stranger)
Honourable Mention: Richard Tardif, Tonnerre noir (Arna Bontemps, Black Thunder)
1993 - Lori Saint-Martin and Paul Gagné, Ana Historique (Daphne Marlatt, Ana Historic)
Honourable Mention: Pierre Anctil, Poèmes yiddish / Yidishe lieder (Jacob Isaac Segal)
1994 - Claire Rothman, The Influence of a Book (Phillipe-Ignace François Aubert de Gaspé, L'influence d'un livre)
1995 - Florence Bernard, Cet heritage au gout de sel (Alistair MacLeod, The Lost Salt Gift of Blood)
1996 - Bodil Jelhof Jensen, Dilemma (Agnes Jelhof Jensen)
1997 - Don Coles, For the Living and the Dead (Tomas Tranströmer, För Levande och Döda)
1998 - Diego Bastianutti, A Major Selection of the Poetry of Giuseppe Ungaretti (Giuseppe Ungaretti, Vita d'un uomo. Tutte le poesie)
1999 - Jill Cairns, The Indiscernible Movement (Aude, Cet imperceptible mouvement)
2000 - Chava Rosenfarb, Bociany and Of Lodz and Love (own work)
Honourable Mention: Rachelle Renaud, Any Mail? and other stories (Gérald Tougas)
2001 - Agnès Guitard, Les hauturiers (Farley Mowat, The Farfarers)
Honourable Mention: S. E. Stewart, The Setting Lake Sun (J. R. Léveillé, Le soleil du lac qui se couche)
2002 - Ook Chung, Le champ électrique (Kerri Sakamoto, The Electrical Field)
2003 - Yolande Amzallag, Le canari éthique. Science, société et esprit humain (Margaret Somerville, The Ethical Canary: Science, Society and the Human Spirit)
2004 - Emmy Bos, La chambre d'amis (Marcel Möring, Modelvliegen)
Honourable Mention - Hélène Garrett, Haiku in Papiamentu (Elis Juliana)
2005 - Benoit Léger, Miracles en série (Carol Shields, Various Miracles)
2006 - Francis Catalano, Instructions pour la lecture d'un journal (Valerio Magrelli, Didascalie per la lettura di un giornale)
Honourable mention: Joan Irving, Caribou Hunter: A Song of a Vanished Innu Life (Serge Bouchard, Récits de Mathieu Mestokosho, chasseur innu)
2007 - Marie Frankland, La chaise berçante (A. M. Klein, The Rocking Chair)
2008 - Caroline Larue, La prophétie d'Ophelia (Elaine Arsenault, Ophelia's Prophecy)
Honourable mention: Daniel Canty, Pierre blanche: Poèmes d'Alice (Stephanie Bolster, White Stone: The Alice Poems)
2009 - no prize
2010 - Louis Bouchard and Marie-Elisabeth Morf, D’ailleurs (Verena Stefan, Fremdschläfer)
2011 - Casey Roberts, Break Away: Jessie on My Mind (Sylvain Hotte, Panache)
2012 - no prize
2013 - Madeleine Stratford, Ce qu'il faut dire a des fissures (Tatiana Oroño, Lo que hay que decir tiene grieta)
2014 - Stéphanie Roesler, Helleborus et Alchémille (Elana Wolff, selected poetry)
2015 - Marietta Morry and Lynda Muir, As the Lilacs Bloomed (Anna Molnár Hegedűs)
2016 - no prize
2017 - Catherine Leroux, Corps conducteurs (Sean Michaels, Us Conductors)
2018 - Sauline Letendre, Rouge, jaune et vert (Alejandro Saravia, Rojo, amarillo y verde)
2019 - Rémi Labrecque, Mes souliers me fonts mourir (Robyn Sarah, My Shoes Are Killing Me)
2020 - Louis Hamelin, Les été de l’ourse (Muriel Wylie Blanchet,The Curve of Times)
2021 - TBA

External links
John Glassco Translation Prize

Canadian literary awards
Translation awards
Awards established in 1982
1982 establishments in Canada